Lick Branch is a stream in Morgan County in the U.S. state of Missouri. It is a tributary of the Osage River.

Lick Branch was so named on account of nearby mineral licks which attracted deer.

See also
List of rivers of Missouri

References

Rivers of Morgan County, Missouri
Rivers of Missouri